Alexander Park Leitch, Baron Leitch (born 20 October 1947 in Fife, Scotland) is a British Labour peer and Chairman of Bupa and FNZ Ltd.

Biography
Leitch was born in 1948. He was educated at Dunfermline High School and was offered a place at university two years early, at just 16 years of age. However, he turned his place down and instead headed to London to work in the IT department of an insurance company. In 1965, Sandy started his career as a computer programmer, writing the first ever life assurance ‘search engine’ program in 1967. He remained in the insurance industry throughout his career, rising to become Chief Executive of Allied Dunbar before it was eventually merged with Zurich Financial Services in 1998. He was then appointed Chief Executive of Zurich Financial Services UK and retired in 2004.

Leitch became a life peer as Baron Leitch, of Oakley in Fife on 7 June 2004. Having demonstrated his commitment to public service, he became chair of the National Employment Panel in 2004 and also led the Leitch Review of Skills which was published on 5 December 2006. The objective of the review was "to identify the UK's optimal skills mix for 2020 to maximise economic growth, productivity and social justice, set out the balance of responsibility for achieving that skills profile and consider the policy framework required to support it." In 2017 he started setting up the ‘What Is More?’ Foundation, to encourage spiritual and multi-faith debate.

Career 
Leitch was previously Chairman of Intrinsic Financial Services and a Founder Member. Additionally, he was chairman at Scottish Widows plc, deputy chairman at Lloyds Banking Group plc, and on the Board of Old Mutual Wealth. He was a Trustee of the Lloyds Banking Group Charitable Foundation. He is Chancellor of Carnegie College, chairman of a new think tank called ‘The Centre for Modern Families’ and strategic adviser to a Prince of Wales charity called PRIME.

His past roles include:
 Lloyds Banking Group plc (2005–2012) – a board member with a variety of roles including Chairman of Scottish Widows plc, LBG Risk Oversight Committee Chair, LBG senior independent director and finally as LBG deputy chairs.
 Paternoster UK Ltd (2006–2010) – non-executive director for four years before selling the company to Goldman Sachs.
 Chair and chief executive, Zurich Financial Services UK, Ireland, South Africa and Asia Pacific. 
 Chair of the Association of British Insurers.
 United Business Media plc (2005–2007) – non-executive director and senior independent director.
 Medical Aid Films – stepped down as chair of this infant and maternal mortality charity.
 National Portrait Gallery of Scotland – chaired the raising of £17 million of funds to refurbish the gallery.

Relationship with Gordon Brown
Leitch is described as a "confidante" of Gordon Brown.

Personal life
He has three daughters from his first marriage, and a young daughter and son from his second. He lives in South Kensington, London and has a home in Edinburgh.

He is a keen follower of his local Scottish football team (Dunfermline Athletic) as well as having a passion for antique collecting and fine malt whisky.

He is a Freeman of the City of London. He has an honorary doctorate in business administration and a fellowship from Carnegie College.

Titles and honours
 Mr Alexander Leitch (1947–2004)
 The Right Honourable The Lord Leitch (2004 – )

Notes

References 
 http://hansard.millbanksystems.com/people/mr-alexander-leitch

1947 births
Living people
People from Fife
Labour Party (UK) life peers
Scottish chief executives
People educated at Dunfermline High School
Life peers created by Elizabeth II